Jevne is a surname. Notable people with the surname include:

Erling Jevne (born 1966), Norwegian cross-country skier
Jack Jevne (1892–1972), American screenwriter, actor, and World War I sergeant
Tor Jevne (1928–2001), Norwegian footballer